Daisy May Bates, CBE (born Margaret Dwyer; 16 October 1859 – 18 April 1951) was an Irish-Australian journalist, welfare worker and self-taught anthropologist who conducted fieldwork amongst several Indigenous nations in western and southern Australia. Bates was a lifelong student of Australian Aboriginal culture and society and was the first anthropologist to carry out a detailed study of Australian Aboriginal culture. Some Aboriginal people referred to Bates by the courtesy name Kabbarli "grandmother."

Early life
Daisy Bates was born Margaret Dwyer in County Tipperary in 1859, when it was under British rule.  Her mother, Bridget (née Hunt), died of tuberculosis in 1862 when the girl was three.  Her widowed father, James Edward O'Dwyer, married Mary Dillon in 1864 and died en route to the United States, planning to send for his daughter after he got settled. Dwyer was raised in Roscrea by relatives, and educated at the National School in that town.

Emigration and life in Australia
Dwyer said that she left Ireland for "health reasons", which was repeated by some sources, but biographer Julia Blackburn discovered that after getting her first job as a governess in Dublin at age 18, there was a scandal, presumably sexual in nature, which resulted in the young man of the house taking his own life. This story has never been verified, but if true, could have spurred Dwyer to leave Ireland and reinvent her history, setting a pattern for the rest of her life. It was not until long after her death that facts about her early life emerged, and even recent biographers disagree in their accounts of her life and work.

Dwyer settled first at Townsville, Queensland, purportedly staying first at the home of the Bishop of North Queensland. Later she stayed with family friends who had migrated earlier. On the later stage of her journey, Dwyer encountered Ernest C. Baglehole and James C. Hann, amongst others. Both Baglehole and Hann had boarded at Batavia bound for Australia. She may have been introduced to the bishop through Hann. His father William Hann had donated £1000 for the construction of St James Church of England, a few years before Bishop Stanton had arrived at Townsville.

Dwyer subsequently found employment as a governess on Fanning Downs Station. She married poet and horseman Breaker Morant (Harry Morant aka Edwin Murrant) on 13 March 1884 in Charters Towers; the union lasted only a short time. Dwyer reputedly threw Morant out because he failed to pay for the wedding and stole some livestock. The marriage was not legal, as Morant was under age (he said he was twenty-one, but was only nineteen). They were never divorced. Morant biographer Nick Bleszynski suggests that Dwyer played a more important role in Morant's life than has been previously thought, and that she persuaded him to change his name from Edwin Murrant to Harry Harbord Morant.

After separating from Morant, Dwyer moved to the property "Glenworth" at Bellawongarah via Berry (Broughton creek) New South Wales as the governess for James and Robina Wilson's children, James, William and Elizabeth (Bessie). James Wilson was formerly of Derrykeeghan Mills townland County Fermanagh Ireland. 
Daisy was a friend of John (James Wilson's brother) and Agnes Wilson of Charter towers. They organised Daisy position with James Wilson (First Mayor of Broughton creek now Berry NSW) at  "Glenworth" for her to get away from Harry "Breaker" Morant.
She continued staying with family on and off for some time as the children grew. She also lived at Pyree via Nowra for a time. It is said she met John Jack Bates whilst she worked with James Wilson's family. 
Daisy stayed with James Wilson's son James and Grandon James in 1933-1934 and again in the early 1940's to recovered her health before returning south Australia, She stayed in touch with the family until her death and sent a signed book to Bessie in 1950 for her nephew.

Daisy said that she became engaged to Philip Gipps (the son of a former governor) but he died before they could marry; no records support this assertion. Biographer Bob Reece calls this story 'nonsense', as Gipps died in February 1884, before Dwyer married Morant.

She met and became involved with John (Jack) Bates, and they married on 17 February 1885. Like Morant, he was a bushman and drover. Their only child, Arnold Hamilton Bates, was born on 26 August 1886 in Bathurst, New South Wales.

Bates also married Ernest Baglehole that year on 10 June 1885. They had met on her immigration voyage.  They married at St Stephen's Anglican Church, Newtown, Sydney. He was recorded as a seaman, but he was the son of a wealthy London family. He had become a ship's officer after completing an apprenticeship, and this might have been his attraction for Dwyer. Some biographers speculate that Arnold's biological father was Ernest Baglehole, not Bates. The polygamous nature of Bates's marriages was kept secret during her lifetime.

The Bates marriage was not a happy one. Jack's work kept him away from home for long periods. During those times she sometimes lived in Pyree and "Glenworth" Bellawongarah.

In February 1894, Bates returned to England, enrolling her son Arnold in a Catholic boarding school and telling Jack that she would return to Australia only when he had a home established for her. She arrived penniless in England, but found a job working for journalist and social campaigner WT Stead. Despite her skeptical views, she worked as an assistant editor on the psychic quarterly Borderlands. She developed an active intellectual life among London's well-connected and bohemian literary and political milieu.

After she left Stead's employment in 1896, it is unclear how she supported herself until 1899. That year she set sail for Western Australia after Jack wrote to say that he was looking for a property there.

In addition, she had been intrigued by a letter published that year in The Times about the cruelty of West Australian settlers to Aborigines. As Bates was preparing to return to Australia, she wrote to The Times offering to investigate the accusations, and report the results to them. Her offer was accepted, and she sailed back to Australia in August 1899.

Involvement with Australian Aboriginal people

Bates became interested in the Aboriginal Australians for their own cultures. In the foreword of her book, written by Alan Moorehead, he said, "As far as I can make out she never tried to teach the Australians Aborigines anything or convert them to any faith. She preferred them to stay as they were and live out the last of their days in peace." Moorehead also wrote, "She was not an anthropologist but she knew them better than anyone else who ever lived; and she made them interesting not only to herself but to us as well."

In all, Bates devoted 40 years of her life to studying Aboriginal life, history, culture, rites, beliefs and customs. She researched and wrote on the subject while living in a tent in small settlements from Western Australia to the edges of the Nullarbor Plain, including at Ooldea in South Australia. She was noted for her strict lifelong adherence to Edwardian fashion, including wearing boots, gloves and a veil while in the bush.

Bates set up camps to feed, clothe and nurse the transient Aboriginal people, drawing on her own income to meet the needs of the aged. She was said to have worn pistols even in her old age and to have been quite prepared to use them to threaten police when she caught them mistreating "her" Aborigines.

Given the strains that the Aborigines suffered from European encroachment on their lands and culture, Bates was convinced that they were a dying race. She believed that her mission was to record as much as she could about them before they disappeared. In a 1921 article in the  Sunday Times (Perth), Bates advocated a "woman patrol" to prevent the movement of Aborigines from the Central Australian Reserve into settled areas, to prevent conflict and interracial unions. She later responded to criticism of her effort to keep the people separated, by civil-rights leader William Harris, Aborigine. He said that part-Aboriginal, mixed-race people could be of value to Australian society. But Bates wrote, "As to the half-castes, however early they may be taken and trained, with very few exceptions, the only good half-caste is a dead one."

Western Australia
On her return voyage she met Father Dean Martelli, a Roman Catholic priest who had worked with Aborigines and who gave her an insight into the conditions they faced. She found a boarding school and home for her son in Perth, and invested some of her money in property as a security for her old age. She proceeded to buy note books and other supplies, and left for the state's remote north-west to gather information on Aborigines and the effects of white settlement.

She wrote articles about conditions around Port Hedland and other areas for geographical society journals, local newspapers, and The Times. She developed a lifelong interest in the lives and welfare of Aboriginal people in Western and South Australia.

Based at the Beagle Bay Mission near Broome, Bates at the age of thirty-six began what became her life's work. Her accounts, among the first attempts at a serious study of Aboriginal culture, were published in the Journal of Agriculture and later by anthropological and geographical societies in Australia and overseas.

While at the mission, she compiled a dictionary of several local dialects. It contained some two thousand words and sentences; she also included notes on legends and myths. In April 1902 Bates, accompanied by her son and her husband, set out on a droving trip from Broome to Perth. It provided good material for her articles. After spending six months in the saddle and travelling four thousand kilometers, Bates knew that her marriage was over.

Following her final separation from Bates in 1902, she spent most of the rest of her life in outback Western and South Australia. There she studied and worked for the remote Aboriginal tribes. They were suffering high mortality because of the incursions of European settlement and the introduction of new infectious diseases, to which they had no immunity. In addition, their societies were disrupted by having to adapt to modern technology and western culture.

In 1904, the Registrar General of Western Australia, Malcolm Fraser, appointed her to research Aboriginal customs, languages and dialects. She worked nearly seven years on this project, compiling and organizing the data. Many of her papers were read at Geographical and Royal Society meetings.

In 1910–11 she accompanied anthropologist Alfred Radcliffe-Brown, later a full professor, and writer and biologist E. L. Grant Watson on a Cambridge ethnological expedition to study  into Western Australian marriage customs. She was appointed a "Travelling Protector" of the Aborigines, with a special commission to conduct inquiries into all native conditions and problems, such as employment on stations, guardianship, and the morality of Aboriginal and half-caste women in towns and mining camps.

Bates was said later to come into conflict with Radcliffe-Brown after sending him her manuscript report of the expedition. Much to her chagrin, he did not return it for many years. When he did, he had annotated it extensively with critical remarks. At a symposium, Bates accused Radcliffe-Brown of plagiarising from her work. She was scheduled to speak after Radcliffe-Brown had presented his paper, but when she rose, she only complimented him on his presentation of her work, and resumed her seat.

A "Protector of Aborigines"
After 1912, her application to become the Northern Territory's Protector of Aborigines was rejected on the basis of gender. Bates continued her work independently, financing it by selling her cattle station.

The same year she became the first woman to be appointed as Honorary Protector of Aborigines at Eucla. During the sixteen months she spent there, Bates changed from a semi-professional scientist and ethnologist to a staunch friend and protector of the Aborigines. She decided to live among them in order to look after them, and to observe and record their lives and lifestyle.

Bates stayed at Eucla until 1914, when she travelled to Adelaide, Melbourne and Sydney to attend the Science Congress of the Association for the Advancement of Science. Before returning to the desert, she gave lectures in Adelaide, which aroused the interests of several women's organisations.

During her years at Ooldea, she financed the supplies she bought for the Aborigines from the sale of her property. To maintain her income, she also wrote numerous articles and papers for newspapers, magazines, and learned societies. Through journalist and author Ernestine Hill, Bates's work was introduced to the general public. Much of the publicity tended to focus on her sensational stories of cannibalism among the Aborigines. 

In August 1933 the Commonwealth Government invited Bates to Canberra to advise on Aboriginal affairs. The next year she was created a Commander of the Order of the British Empire by King George V. Bates was more interested in the fact that the honor supported her ability to get her work published.

South Australia
She left Ooldea and went to Adelaide. With the help of Ernestine Hill, Bates published a series of articles for leading Australian newspapers, titled My Natives and I. At the age of seventy-one, she still walked every day to her office at The Advertiser building. 

Later the Commonwealth Government paid her a stipend of $4 a week to assist her in putting all her papers and notes in order, and preparing her planned manuscript. But with no other income, she found it too expensive to remain in Adelaide. She moved to the village settlement of Pyap on the Murray River, where she pitched her tent and set up her typewriter.

In 1938, she published The Passing of the Aborigines which asserted that there were practices of cannibalism and infanticide. This generated considerable publicity about her book.

Final years
In 1941 Bates returned to her tent life at Wynbring Siding, east of Ooldea. She lived there on and off until 1945, when she returned to Adelaide because of her health.

In 1948 she tried, through the Australian Army, to contact her son Arnold Bates, who had served in France during World War I. Later, in 1949, she contacted the Army again, through the Returned and Services League of Australia (RSL), in an effort to reach him. Arnold was living in New Zealand but refused to have anything to do with his mother.

Daisy Bates died on 18 April 1951, aged 91. She is buried at Adelaide's North Road Cemetery.

Recognition and memberships
Bates was elected a member of the Royal Geographical Society (Melbourne).
In 1907 she was elected a Fellow of the Royal Anthropological Society of Australasia (F.R.A.S.).
She was appointed an honorary corresponding member of the Royal Anthropological Institute of Great Britain and Ireland.
In 1934 she was appointed a Commander of the Order of the British Empire (CBE).

Digital database
There is a collaborative Internet project by the National Library of Australia and the University of Melbourne to digitise and transcribe many word lists compiled by Bates in the 1900s. The project is co-ordinated by Nick Thieburger, to digitise all the microfilmed images from Section XII of the Bates papers. It can provide a valuable resource for those researching especially Western Australian languages, and some of those in the Northern Territory and South Australia.

In popular culture
Marjorie Gwynne's 1941 painting of Bates shows her sitting a desk sorting through correspondence. The portrait now hangs in the Art Gallery of South Australia. Sidney Nolan's 1950 painting Daisy Bates at Ooldea shows Bates standing in a barren outback landscape. It was acquired by the National Gallery of Australia. An episode in her life was the basis for Margaret Sutherland's chamber opera The Young Kabbarli (1964). Choreographer Margaret Barr represented Bates in two dance dramas, Colonial portraits (1957), and Portrait of a Lady with the CBE (1971). In 1972, ABC TV screened Daisy Bates, a series of four 30 minute episodes, written by James Tulip, produced by Robert Allnutt, with art by Guy Gray Smith; choreography and reading by Margaret Barr, danced by Christine Cullen; music composed by Diana Blom, sung by Lauris Elms.  Her involvement with the Aboriginal people is the basis for the 1983 lithograph The Ghost of Kabbarli by Susan Dorothea White.

References

Works cited

Further reading
 Blackburn, Julia. (1994) Daisy Bates in the Desert: A Woman's Life Among the Aborigines, London, Secker & Warburg. 
 De Vries, Susanna. (2008) Desert Queen: The many lives and loves of Daisy Bates Pymble, N.S.W. HarperCollins Publishers. 
Ker Wilson, Barbara. (1972)  Tales told to Kabbarli: Aboriginal legends collected by Daisy Bates. Retold by Barbara Ker Wilson. Illustrated by Harold Thomas  Angus and Robertson, Sydney.

External links

 
 "Seven Sisters" – includes a collection of quotes by and about Daisy Bates
 Daisy Bates – A list of her papers held by University of Adelaide Library
 Daisy Bates – Guide to the papers at the National Library of Australia (including the rare maps)
 Daisy May Bates – Guide to records at the South Australian Museum Archives
 Works by Daisy Bates, at Project Gutenberg Australia
 The Ghost of Kabbarli (Daisy Bates), lithograph (1983) by Susan Dorothea White
 Digital Daisy Bates – a project in the School of Languages and Linguistics at The University of Melbourne
 

1859 births
1951 deaths
Amateur anthropologists
Australian journalists
Australian women journalists
Australian anthropologists
Australian women anthropologists
Burials at North Road Cemetery
People from Roscrea
Female travelers
19th-century Australian women writers
20th-century Australian women writers
20th-century Australian writers